Sami Tajeddine (born 10 June 1982) is a Moroccan football player who, was playing for Raja Casablanca.

He was part of the Moroccan 2004 Olympic football team, who exited in the first round, finishing third in group D, behind group winners Iraq and runners-up Costa Rica.

References

External links

1982 births
Living people
Moroccan footballers
Olympic footballers of Morocco
Footballers at the 2004 Summer Olympics
Raja CA players
Morocco international footballers
Association football defenders